Bulbophyllum sect. Hyalosema is a section of the genus Bulbophyllum.

Description
Plants in this section are characterized by having distinct pseudobulbs with new growths sprouting from the basal node and not from fused pseudobulbs, usually bearing a single flower with tubular floral bracts, with a stalk from the basal node, free sepals or the lateral one connate along the lower margin, which is equal to or slightly shorter than the medians, caudate obtuse, margins entire, glabrous to papillose to bristly, and usually 5-veined. Petals obtuse to caudate, nucleus caudate, tip often thick, globular ellipsoid-cylindrical, appendage, margins entire, glabrous, usually 3-veined. The lip is mobile in a fine ligament, undivided, margins entire, glabrous to papillose to ciliate, often concave adaxially near the base and without ridges, surfaces glabrous to hirsute parts. It has 4 pollinia. The type species is Bulbophyllum grandiflorum

Distribution
Plants from this section are found in Southeast Asia.

Species
Bulbophyllum section  Hyalosema comprises the following species:

References

Orchid subgenera